Kelvin Peter Wanjohi (born 21 August 1994) professionally known as DJ Fita, is a Kenyan DJ, music producer and music journalist from Thika. He is best known for remixing Kenyan pop music into upbeat electronic dance music. DJ Fita is also a member of Fitemba. He was nominated for the VJ of the Year 2015 during the annual Stylus DJ Awards.

Early life and education 
DJ Fita was born in Makongeni Estate Thika. He graduated with a diploma in IT from Jomo Kenyatta University of Agriculture & Technology and a degree in Information Security & Forensics from KCA University.

Career 
DJ Fita uploaded an unofficial remix for Kookoo by Elani on SoundCloud in 2014. He subsequently joined EDM Kenya, a community-based website that promotes House music artists from Kenya.

In July 2016,DJ Fita released back to back remixes first releasing an official remix for "Doing It Right" by DJ Nruff on 11 July 2016. Shortly after, he participated in the Chemistry remix Challenge by Tetu Shani. The challenge featured 36 producers from around Kenya, making it one of the defining tracks of the Nu-Nairobi Movement and one of the biggest songs on Kenya's SoundCloud in 2016. DJ Fita's remix is the first track to feature two consecutive weekends on The Undercover segment on the Weekend Breakfast show on Homeboyz Radio; he only shares this record with Hendrick.

On 27 January 2017, DJ Fita released a remix for Mungu Pekee by Nyashinski which was made available for free download on his SoundCloud account. The remix quickly gained traction in the club scene and was soon picked up by radio leading to an on-air radio interview on Homeboyz Radio in February.

In 2018, he was invited to play three major Kenyan Festivals, Africa Nouveau Festival, Ongea Summit 2018 and Earthdance Music Festival as well as going on his debut tour, Break It All Apart Tour. He performed with legendary Benga Music artist Makadem. Makadem & The Electric Bengaloo is an Afro-electronic live band that fuses Benga sounds of the Nyatiti with electronic dance music elements. During the shows, he changed his usual DJ set-up adding an Akai MPD18 Midi Pad Controller and Ableton Live. On 20 August 2018, DJ Fita released his debut official artist single which features Groove Awards nominee, Twist, supported by a 4-stop tour in Kenya and Kigali, Rwanda.

On 15 March 2019, DJ Fita appeared as the special guest on Adoveli Podcast season 3 episode 11.  Later on the same day, a new Afro-tech track titled "jackals" by DJ Fita was given its first airplay on African Moves, Drums Radio, UK by DJ OneDown

2020: Name of Love EP 
In August 2020, DJ Fita announced his debut EP, Name of Love, which was released in November 2020. The first single, Ghetto Love, features Poly Joe and Hendrick Sam and was noted for varying from his previous work.

Fitemba 
DJ Fita's first full-length project was with Brian Mahemba under the guise of "Fitemba" (a portmanteau of Fita and Mahemba.) The duo released their first EP, Untitled EP on 19 August 2016.

Fitemba teamed up with Hendrick to produce a single on DJ Nruff's album which was released on iTunes on 25 September 2017. The track features Dan 'chizi' Aceda. Fitemba were listed on the Kenyan EDM Artists of 2017 by Internet Radio LionAfriq.

Redux 
In an interview with Rae Kiragu and DJ Kafi on May 20, 2018, DJ Fita premiered a Dubstep remix for Ten Toes by Kenyan-Norwegian rapper STL. DJ Fita revealed that the remix was a collaborative project with DJ/Producer Pinch 254 for their new project called Redux.The remix has never been released to date

Awards and nominations

Tours
Headlining
 Break It All Apart Tour (2018)

References 

Kenyan musicians
People from Nairobi
1994 births
Kenyan DJs
Living people